South Korean pop group TVXQ, known as  in Japanese releases, have released nineteen studio albums (five which were re-released under different titles), three extended plays (released as "special albums"), four compilation albums, nine live albums, four remix albums, one soundtrack album and one box set. The group has sold over 14 million physical records since 2004, including 9.4 million in Japan, making them one of the best-selling K-pop acts of all time.

TVXQ released their debut single "Hug" in January 2004. Their first studio album Tri-Angle (2004) debuted at number one on the Monthly Albums Chart by the Music Industry Association of Korea (MIAK), starting a winning streak of number-one albums for the group in the country. Influenced by their label mate BoA, TVXQ crossed over to the Japanese music industry in 2005, and released their debut Japanese studio album Heart, Mind and Soul in March 2006. The album peaked at number twenty-five on the Oricon Albums Chart, selling less than 10,000 copies. However, sales improved for their second Japanese album Five in the Black (2007), which peaked at number ten on the Oricon. Their third Japanese album T, released in January 2008, was TVXQ's first gold-certified album from the Recording Industry Association of Japan (RIAJ). In-Between their early J-pop endeavors, they issued two more Korean albums Rising Sun (2005) and "O"-Jung.Ban.Hap. (2006), both being best-selling top-charters in K-pop music charts across Asia.

In September 2008, the group released their fourth Korean studio album Mirotic, their most critically successful and best-selling album to date. It is the first Korean album in four years to break past half a million copies, and is the highest-selling Korean album of the year across Asia. In March 2009, TVXQ released their fourth Japanese album The Secret Code, their first platinum-certified album by the RIAJ. A year later, TVXQ achieved their first number-one record in Japan with the release of their Japanese greatest hits album Best Selection 2010, the fastest-selling and best-selling album of their career. It achieved a double platinum certification from the RIAJ after only a month of release. Best Selection 2010 is the last record to feature members Jaejoong, Yoochun, and Junsu.

After a year of hiatus, TVXQ returned as a duo act with members Yunho and Changmin in January 2011. They released TVXQ's fifth Korean album Keep Your Head Down, debuting at number one on the Gaon Albums Chart. In September, the duo issued TVXQ's fifth Japanese album Tone, which became TVXQ's first original studio album to top the Oricon, breaking a sales record previously set by Bon Jovi. The duo's next studio efforts, the Korean album Catch Me (2012) and the Japanese album Time (2013) were major commercial successes and chart toppers, the latter being TVXQ's fastest-selling original album in Japan.

TVXQ's commercial success continues with the release of their seventh Korean studio album Tense in January 2014. According to South Korea's Hanteo Information System, Tense is TVXQ's fastest-selling Korean album since Mirotic in 2008. The release of TVXQ's eighth Japanese album With (2014) pushed TVXQ to be the first international artist in Japan to have four number-one studio albums in a row.

Studio albums

Special albums

Compilation albums

Live albums

Soundtrack albums

Remix albums

Box sets

Other releases

See also
TVXQ singles discography
TVXQ videography
List of songs recorded by TVXQ
List of awards and nominations received by TVXQ

Notes
A  Prior to the establishment of the Gaon Music Chart in 2010, South Korea's music charts were supplied by the Music Industry Association of Korea (MIAK), which stopped compiling data in 2008. There are no reliably sourced cumulative chart records for albums sold in 2009.
Specific

References

Discography
Discographies of South Korean artists
K-pop music group discographies